All This Sounds Gas is the 2001 debut album from Preston School of Industry. Its title is a reference to George Harrison's album All Things Must Pass.

Reception 

All This Sounds Gas received positive reviews from critics. On Metacritic, the album holds a score of 72/100 based on 13 reviews, indicating "generally favorable reviews."

Track listing 
All songs written by Spiral Stairs.

"All This Sounds Gas" is a 1:33 hidden bonus track after nine seconds of silence.  The CD opens with a 1:13 pregap track, with 0:30 of silence and a 0:43 collage of music (mostly backwards) that leads directly into the intro of "Whalebones."

References 

2001 debut albums
Preston School of Industry (band) albums
Matador Records albums